Captain George John Sandys (23 September 1875 – 3 September 1937) was a British diplomat and Conservative politician.

Early life 
Sandys was the son of James Sandys, of Slade House, Stroud, Gloucestershire, and was educated at Clifton College and Pembroke College, Oxford.

Military career 
He was commissioned as a second lieutenant and served with the Glamorgan Yeomanry in the Second Boer War from 1899, then transferred to the regular army when he became a second lieutenant in the 5th Dragoon Guards on 15 August 1900, receiving a promotion to lieutenant on 28 August 1901 while still in South Africa.
After the end of the war he transferred to the 2nd Life Guards in November 1902, leaving the army in 1905. He rejoined to serve in the British Expeditionary Force in the First World War and was wounded at Ypres.

Parliamentary and diplomatic career 
Sandys was a Member of Parliament for Wells from 1910 to 1918. He later joined the diplomatic service, serving as an Honorary Attaché in the British Legation in Bern (1921–22) and Paris (1922-25).

Personal life 
He married Mildred Helen, née Cameron, daughter of Duncan Cameron, of Canterbury, New Zealand in 1905. They had one child, a son Duncan Sandys. Duncan became a member of parliament and cabinet minister, and Duncan's daughter Laura Sandys, also a Conservative politician, was elected to represent South Thanet in 2010. Sandys divorced Mildred in January 1921.

Death 
He died in Antibes, France.

References

External links 
 
 Image of Captain George John Sandys (1875-1937) The Lafayette Negative Archive

1875 births
1937 deaths
Conservative Party (UK) MPs for English constituencies
UK MPs 1910–1918
Alumni of Pembroke College, Oxford
Glamorgan Yeomanry officers
5th Dragoon Guards officers
British Life Guards officers
George